Boyertown (Pennsylvania Dutch: Boyerschteddel) is a borough in Berks County, Pennsylvania. The population was 4,055 at the 2010 census. Boyertown is known for the many painted fiberglass bears that can be found throughout the town and borough.

History

A post office called Boyertown has been in operation since 1828. The community was named for its founders, brothers Henry and Daniel Boyer.

In 1908, Boyertown was the site of the Rhoads Opera House fire.

Geography
Boyertown is located along the southeastern border of Berks County. It is bordered on the north, west, and south by Colebrookdale Township, and to the southeast by Douglass Township in Montgomery County.

Boyertown is included in the Reading metropolitan statistical area, which is part the Philadelphia-Reading-Camden combined statistical area.

It has a hot-summer humid continental climate (Dfa) and average monthly temperatures range from 30.0 °F in January to 74.7 °F in July. The hardiness zone is 6b.

Demographics

As of the 2000 census, there were 3,940 people, 1,805 households, and 1,025 families residing in the borough. The population density was 4,941.7 people per square mile (1,901.6/km2). There were 1,885 housing units at an average density of 2,364.2 per square mile (909.8/km2). The racial makeup of the borough was 98.83% White, 0.20% African American, 0.03% Native American, 0.36% Asian, 0.13% from other races, and 0.46% from two or more races. Hispanic or Latino of any race were 0.74% of the population.

There were 1,805 households, out of which 24.2% had children under the age of 18 living with them, 44.4% were married couples living together, 8.5% had a female householder, and 43.2% were non-families. 37.5% of all households were made up of individuals, and 19.3% had someone living alone who was 65 years of age or older. The average household size was 2.17 and the average family size was 2.87.

In the borough, the population was spread out, with 21.1% under the age of 18, 7.5% from 18 to 24, 29.2% from 25 to 44, 21.0% from 45 to 64, and 21.2% who were 65 years of age or older. The median age was 40 years. For every 100 females there were 92.5 males. For every 100 females age 18 and over, there were 87.7 males.

The median income for a household in the borough was $39,232, and the median income for a family was $52,943. Males had a median income of $33,783 versus $26,507 for females. The per capita income for the borough was $21,194. About 3.6% of families and 6.0% of the population were below the poverty line, including 5.6% of those under age 18 and 7.5% of those age 65 or over.

Transportation

Pennsylvania Route 73 (Philadelphia Avenue) is the main east–west road through the borough. It leads east-southeast to Schwenksville and eventually Northeast Philadelphia. To the northwest it leads to Blandon north of Reading. Pennsylvania Route 562 (Reading Avenue) leads west to Reading proper. Pennsylvania Route 100 bypasses the borough just outside its eastern border, leading north to Macungie near Allentown and south into Pottstown. A railroad line runs south from Boyertown to Pottstown. This line is used by the Colebrookdale Railroad tourist line and the Eastern Berks Gateway Railroad freight line.

Public education
The borough is served by the Boyertown Area School District.This includes one senior high school, two middle schools, seven elementary schools, and a cyber school program.

Media
The area is served by The Berks-Mont News, a weekly paper with a circulation of 5,500.

Landmarks
 Cabot Corporation
 Rhoads Opera House

Notable people 
 Steve Burns (born 1973), former Blue's Clues host, actor, musician
 James Develin (born 1988), football player for the New England Patriots
 Elaine Irwin Mellencamp (born 1970), former Victoria's Secret model, ex-wife of rock musician John Mellencamp
 John M. Schealer (1920–2008), author of numerous science fiction books for children
 Mark Soper (born 1959), actor
 Carl Spaatz (1891–1974), Army general during World War II

Sister cities 
Boyertown has one sister city, as designated by Sister Cities International:
  - Bohodukhiv, Kharkivs'ka (Kharkiv), Ukraine

References

External links

 Borough of Boyertown official website
 History of Boyertown

1835 establishments in Pennsylvania
Boroughs in Berks County, Pennsylvania
Populated places established in 1835